Dirty Little Billy is a 1972 American revisionist western film co-written and directed by Stan Dragoti and starring Michael J. Pollard and Richard Evans. Set in Coffeyville, Kansas, the film was influenced by the darker, more sinister style of Spaghetti Westerns and offered a unique insight into the beginnings of the titular notorious outlaw. It is notable for Nick Nolte's film debut, along with a background appearance for experimental filmmaker/artist William Ault.

Plot
A tough and violent portrait of a psychopathic, yet fresh-faced youth—the infamous Billy the Kid in his grimy early days.

Cast
 Michael J. Pollard as Billy Bonney
 Richard Evans as "Goldie"
 Lee Purcell as Berle
 Charles Aidman as Ben Antrim
 Dran Hamilton as Catherine McCarty
 Willard Sage as Henry McCarty
 Mills Watson as Ed
 Alex Wilson as Len
 Ronny Graham as Charles Nile
 Josip Elic as "Jawbone"
 Richard Stahl as Earl Lovitt
 Gary Busey as Basil Crabtree
 Dick Van Patten as Berle's Customer
 Scott Walker as "Stormy"
 Rosary Nix as "Louisiana"
 Frank Welker as Young Punk
 Craig Bovia as Buffalo Hunter
 Severn Darden as Jim "Big Jim" McDaniel
 Henry Proach as Lloyd
 Len Lesser as "Slits"
 Ed Lauter as Tyler

Release
The film premiered at the San Francisco Film Festival on October 20, 1972 before opening at the Vogue Theatre in San Francisco five days later.

Reception
Steven Puchalski wrote in Shock Cinema magazine:This is no typical, Tinseltown western though. It's more like The Making of a Sociopath, with Michael J. Pollard starring as displaced, 17-year-old Billy Bonney, in the days leading up to his evolution into the notorious Billy the Kid ... this is the perfect role for Pollard.  And though a little old to play a teenager (he was 33), he hands us a Billy who's perpetually victimized by bad luck, until he finally blows a gasket at the very end and sparks his future.

See also
 List of American films of 1972

References

External links
 
 
 
 

1972 films
1972 Western (genre) films
1970s biographical films
American Western (genre) films
American biographical films
Columbia Pictures films
Biographical films about Billy the Kid
Films directed by Stan Dragoti
1972 directorial debut films
1970s English-language films
1970s American films